The 2004 European Pairs Speedway Championship was the inaugural edition of the European Pairs Speedway Championship. The final was held in Debrecen, Hungary on 12 September. The Cezch Republic won the first edition of the Championship.

Semifinal 1
  Terenzano
 ?
 only 14 heats

Draw 1.  →  B

Semifinal 2
  Rivne
 ?

Draw 1.  →  B
Draw 2.  →  C

Final 
Final
2004-09-12
 Debrecen
Referee:

See also
 2004 Individual Speedway European Championship

References 

2004
European P